John Crisp may refer to:

John Crysp, MP for Canterbury
John Crisp, late 18th century deputy governor of British Bencoolen
Sir John Wilson Crisp, 3rd Baronet (1873–1950), of the Crisp baronets
Sir John Peter Crisp, 4th Baronet (1925–2005), of the Crisp baronets
Sir John Charles Crisp, 5th Baronet (b. 1955), of the Crisp baronets

See also
Jack Crisp, Australian rules footballer
Richard John Crisp, psychologist